Habronattus formosus is a species of jumping spider in the family Salticidae. It is found in the United States.

References

Further reading

 
 
 

Salticidae
Articles created by Qbugbot
Spiders described in 1906
Taxa named by Nathan Banks